Fakebook may refer to:
Fake book, a book of rough sketches of sheet music that is used, particularly in jazz, where improvisation is particularly valued
Fakebook (album), a 1990 album by Yo La Tengo